A 300-page iPhone bill from AT&T Mobility mailed in a box was the subject of a viral video made by YouTube personality Justine Ezarik, best known as iJustine, which became an Internet meme in August 2007. Ezarik's video focused on the unnecessary waste of paper, as the detailed bill itemized all data transfers made during the billing period, including every email and text message. Stories of unexpected billing issues began to circulate in blogs and the technical press after the Apple iPhone's heavily advertised and anticipated release, but this video clip brought the voluminous bills to the attention of the mass media.

Ten days later, after the video had been viewed more than 3 million times on the Internet and had received international news coverage, AT&T sent iPhone users a text message outlining changes in its billing practices. The information technology magazine Computerworld included this incident in its list of "Technology's 10 Most Mortifying Moments".

Background
Apple released the iPhone in the United States with a software "lock" so it could only be used on the AT&T Mobility network. After purchase, buyers activated their iPhone's AT&T service contract using the Apple iTunes software, during which buyers had the ability to choose their billing preference; however, if no option was specified during activation AT&T defaulted to using detailed billing. Detailed billing itemized every data transfer, including background traffic for e-mail, text messaging, and Web browsing. This generated a large number of entries on the detailed bills.

After a month's time as early adopters started receiving their first monthly bills, stories of unusually large and expensive iPhone bills began to circulate. The 300-page bill was exceptional but other heavy users received 50- to 100-page bills. One of the first to attract wider attention was from Ben Kuchera, gaming editor for the technology-related website Ars Technica, who described his 34-sheet, double-sided bill and another 104-page bill sent to a colleague; he wrote, "While many of us have had smart-phones for some time, we've never seen a bill like this." However, it was the release of Justine Ezarik's video that acted as a catalyst to bring widespread media attention to this aspect of the iPhone story.

Video

Justine Ezarik, then a 23-year-old Pittsburgh-area graphic designer and sketch comedian who video blogged with the name iJustine, received her 300-page bill on Saturday, August 11, 2007, and decided to use it as a prop for a self-produced video shot in a coffee shop. She posted the edited one-minute clip to several popular Internet video hosting services by the following Monday. In the first week, the video received over 500,000 total views on YouTube, 350,000 views on Revver, 500,000 views on Break.com, and 1,100,000 views on Yahoo Video, as self-reported by the four popular Internet video sites as of August 22. Total views were reported to exceed 8 million by the end of 2007. Ezarik said she earned $2,000 from the video from Revver.

Portions of the video were also televised along with one-on-one interviews with Ezarik by several national and local news programs in the United States, including CNN, Fox News Channel, WTAE-TV, and WPXI-TV. ABC News Now also included independent reporting by an ABC News Radio reporter in their video interview.

Ezarik's Internet video commentary focused on the unnecessary waste of paper billing. In the video she highlights the physical size of the bill, not the amount due. "I have an iPhone and I had to switch to AT&T. So, that's wonderful. Well, I got my first AT&T bill, right here in a box," she says at the start of the video. The rest of the video, set to the distinctive music used in American iPhone television commercials, shows her opening the box and flipping through the pages in fast motion. The clip ends with the on-screen caption, "Use e-billing. Save a forest."

Her other comments also followed along the same lines. In a blog posting she wrote, "Apparently, they give you a detailed transaction of every text message sent and received. Completely unnecessary." She told a USA Today reporter, "This is so silly, there's no reason they need to send you this much information." Ezarik is a heavy user who typically sends and receives tens of thousands of text messages a month, which generated an exceptionally long $275 bill – 300 double-sided pages that had to be sent in a box with postage charges of $7.

Reaction

Company
AT&T Mobility, the mobile phone service provider for the iPhone said through spokesman Mark Siegel that the size of this bill was exceptional. "We're not sending lots of boxed bills to customers," he told USA Today. He said that the billing is the same for all AT&T mobile users, but the popularity and functionality of the iPhone gave it new visibility. "It's no different than with any other bill for any other device or any other service that we offer."

Later, on August 18, AT&T issued a statement saying: "Our customers have the option of receiving a bill that is detail-free. Also, we have for years encouraged our customers to switch to online billing because it is convenient, secure, and environmentally friendly." Then, on August 22, AT&T announced via text message to iPhone users that it was removing itemized detail from paper bills. Ezarik responded, "Looks like they may have got the message," in response to AT&T's action. Company spokeswoman Lauren Garner claimed public reaction was not the reason for the company's switch from detailed to summary billing, saying, "This was something we planned all along."

Industry
AT&T may not have anticipated the downstream effects of iPhone customers' high data usage.

Internet reporter Dana Blankenhorn stated that the size of the bill illustrated a problem with the telephone companies' "event based" or connection-oriented business model and used it to argue for open spectrum in a radio frequency spectrum auction in the U.S. scheduled for 2008. He contrasted how telephone billing considers every action a separately billable event, while the Internet model is based on a flat fee for best-effort delivery in connectionless mode transmission.

The information technology magazine Computerworld reported on the incident, saying the company's "extraordinarily detailed billing process resulted in some users receiving bills that ran dozens or even hundreds of pages long." It published the gaffe in its list of "Technology's 10 Most Mortifying Moments".

Environmental
Rob Enderle, a Silicon Valley tech analyst also echoed Ezarik's environmental activism, saying, "AT&T should get a new tagline – use AT&T, kill a tree." The USA Today story was also titled "How many trees did your iPhone bill kill?" According to blogger Muhammad Saleem, Apple's aim to have 10 million iPhone users by the end of 2008 would require the logging of about 74,535 trees annually, assuming an average 100-page monthly bill. An editorial in The Blade, an independent newspaper in Toledo, Ohio called the detailed billing "absurd and environmentally wasteful".

Security
One security conscious commenter on the Engadget consumer electronics blog addressed the privacy implications of the oversize bills given the limitations of personal paper shredders, by speculating on whether it would be more practical to dispose of these large bills by burning them to protect personal information. An editor for the libertarian monthly Reason also speculated about the usefulness of the detailed information to government investigators. The original Ars Technica blog posting, on the other hand, dismissed privacy concerns, showing that the detail pages do not contain sensitive information.

Other outsized iPhone bills
Press accounts of this story also included related details and comments:

 The founder of a Tampa, Florida think tank received a 42-page bill and told a reporter, "It's ridiculous."
 An Oak Harbor, Ohio teacher called his 52-page bill "the biggest phone bill I've ever gotten in my life".
 A partner of a Macintosh consulting firm called his bill "60 pages of nothingness".
 A business consultant from Virginia received a 62-page bill and asked a reporter, "Why would you send bills that large?"
 A software company owner near Seattle, Washington posted on his blog a picture of a Maltese dog sitting on his 127-page bill spread out on the floor. and asked, "Has anyone on the Apple Environmental Team seen an AT&T bill?"
 "The Packet Rat" columnist wrote in Government Computer News that his wife received a 150-page boxed iPhone bill and commented, "OK, how many trees did they have to kill to send out the first month's bills?"

See also
Customer proprietary network information

References

External links
 , Justine Ezarik's video, on YouTube
 Justine Ezarik's blog entry regarding the August 13, 2007 iPhone bill
  from WTAE-TV News, Pittsburgh
  news story from WTAE-TV News

IPhone
Mobile phone culture
Viral videos
2007 YouTube videos
Internet memes introduced in 2007